Pope Theodosius I of Alexandria (died June 5, 566) was the last Patriarch of Alexandria recognised by both Copts and Melchites.

As successor to Timothy III (IV),  at the request of the Arab king Al-Harith ibn Jabalah al-Ghassani and Empress Theodora's efforts, Jacob Baradaeus ordained a universal bishop in 543/4 AD by Mor Theodosius. He was at first recognized by the Emperor Justinian I and the Eastern Orthodox Church. However, because of his Miaphysite theology, he was rejected by the Eastern Orthodox Church of Alexandria and exiled by the Emperor Justinian I in 536. In his place, Paul was elected Patriarch.

As the Copts continued to recognise Theodosius, the lineage between the Coptic and Melchite split. This split endures until today.

Theodosius spent the last 28 years of his life imprisoned in Upper Egypt and after his death the Coptic Church elected Peter IV as his successor.

Theodosius is commemorated in the Coptic Synaxarion on the 28th day of Ba'unah (June 5), the day of his death.

References
General
 Dietmar W. Winkler: Theodosios von Alexandrien (535–566), Ökumenischer Patriarch der Miaphysiten, in: Zeitschrift für katholische Theologie 121 (1999) 396–412.
 Dietmar W. Winkler: Theodosios of Alexandria and some theological trends of his time (535–566), in: The Harp. A Review of Syriac and Oriental Ecumenical Studies 21 (2006) 73–89.
 

Specific

|-

|-

567 deaths
Coptic Orthodox saints
6th-century Popes and Patriarchs of Alexandria
6th-century Christian saints
Year of birth unknown